Box Grove (Census Tract 5350400.01) is an original community in Markham, Ontario.

History
A Middle Iroquoian settlement existed on the west bank of a tributary of the Little Rouge Creek in the fourteenth century in the area which is today called Box Grove. In 1815, William Beebe was the first European settler in this area; Sparta or Sparty-Wharf (Box Grove in 1867) was registered as a hamlet in 1850. The name suggests that at an early date there was boat traffic on the Rouge River. The hamlet changed to its present name during Canada's Confederation in 1867 when it was granted a post office (McCaffrey General Store later as Box Grove General Store moved to what is now Shell Service Station after 1901). The origin of the name is unclear; it may be due to the activity at the box-making woodworking factory, a reference to the many boxwood trees around the hamlet, or linked to the hamlet of Box Grove in West Sussex, England. In 1867 the hamlet had "a Church, a schoolhouse, two taverns, woolen mill, sawmill, a store, a blacksmith and two axe-makers shops capable of supplying the whole country with axes and augurs on short notice."

The hamlet was the centre of local and small-scale industrial activity. A saw mill, cotton mill wool factory, and "shoddy mill" (for shredding old woolen fabrics for cheaper cloth and stuffing) along the banks of the Rouge River appeared after 1815.  The working hamlet had a cheese factory, hotel, and three taverns for a population of 150 (1880); some neighbouring Mennonites had a "pessimistic" view of worldly Sparta, and sought to avoid travel in the hamlet. A Temperance House was opened in the 1860s by Joseph Lathrop on 14th Avenue. By the end of the nineteenth century the mills had closed (victims of floods and fire), and the White Rose Hotel and Tavern also closed its doors by 1910 (later replaced by residential dwellings and located at what is now 6788 14th Avenue). While industry disappeared in Box Grove, the hamlet remained. The Box Grove General Store (6772 14th Avenue c. 1860), Box Grove Church (2 Legacy Drive c. 1870) and Box Grove Schoolhouse, S.S. #18 (7651 9th Line c.1870), are the only reminders of the once-vibrant hamlet (the Tomlinson family is buried in the church's graveyard). Many homes along 9th Line from north and south of 14th Avenue date to the mid to late 19th Century.

A few prominent families were part of Box Grove:
 Burkholder - one of the last remaining Mennonite families in the area.
 Tomlinson - early settler and operator of the saw and woolen mills in the hamlet
 Raymer - John Nobel Raymer (1837-1874) a Mennonite farmer, and later his son Frank, operated a cheese factory. Abraham Raymer operated a sawmill farther down the Rouge.
 Reesor - Peter Reesor operated saw and grist mills along Little Rouge River
 Rolph - soldier Captain William Rolph (commanding officer of 12th York Regiment) settled in the area and became a dairy farmer.
 McCaffrey - David McCaffrey was postmaster and general store owner

Today, Box Grove has undergone a transformation from protected agricultural land to residential use. Box Grove is located in the area around Ninth Line (also known as Box Grove By-Pass) and 14th Avenue. Residential development began in the late 1990s and continues today.

In 1950 the Box Grove Golf course was built by businessman Nelson Davis on the Tomlinson property which included a portion of the Rouge River valley where their mills were located.  One of the Tomlinsons was buried on the site and the golf course was built leaving the grave and headstone intact.  In 1953, Nelson invited Arnold Palmer to play his course.  Arnold apparently shot an 82 and declared it to be one of the toughest courses he had ever played.  Davis built a lovely stone clubhouse which included a locker room with beautiful wooden lockers.  In 1967, IBM purchased the golf course primarily for use by its employees.  The golf facility included a 9-hole par 3 course and the tough 18-hole course, 9 holes in the valley and 9 holes on the flat ground on the north side of the valley.  In 1997, IBM sold part of the course to Minto for a residential development called Legacy and the Town of Markham took ownership of the valley portion of the course which is now called Markham Green Golf Club.  The original clubhouse has been modified extensively, first by IBM then by the Town and is now an attractive community centre. The Tomlinson grave was moved to the Box Grove Church graveyard and the original gravesite now on the south side of Legacy Drive is marked with a stone monument.

The Box Grove post office was lost in the early 20th century.  The current post office is located inside the Rexall pharmacy at Ninth Line and Copper Creek Drive.

Legacy and Rouge-Fairways

Within Box Grove there are two distinct residential developments built from the former IBM Canada Golf Course, but are not historically considered as communities:

 Legacy - located west of 9th Line, north of 14th Avenue, east of Markham Road and south of Highway 407
 Rouge-Fairways - located west of 9th Line, south of 14th Avenue, east of Markham Road and north of Parkview Golf and Country Club

Transportation
Most commuters in the area travel by car as there is limited bus service by York Region Transit (2 Milliken (weekends), 9 9th Line (weekdays), 14 14th Avenue (weekdays)). Highway 407 serves the area from the Ninth Line interchange; however there is no access onto eastbound Highway 407 from Ninth Line northbound. This has been an ongoing problem for most Box Grove residents who tries to go east on the highway as access to the Highway 407 eastbound is limited. Option 1 is to enter the Highway 407 east from Markham Road which is west of this community, option 2 is to enter the Highway 407 east from York-Durham Line but the interchange is far from this neighbourhood, and option 3 is to make a U turn at Highway 407 and Ninth Line or Donald Cousens Parkway to go east.

Parks and Recreation

Luenta Gardens is named former name of the park (formerly Luneta Park and now Rizal Park) in Manila where Jose Rizal is buried. The small park also has a statue of Rizal.

Other parks in the area includes:

 Bob Hunter Memorial Park (Rouge National Urban Park)
 Collingham Parkette
 Fieldside Mariette
 Riverwalk Park
 Tomlinson Park

Box Grove Community Centre

Box Grove Community Centre at 7651 9th Line is housed in the old Box Grove Schoolhouse (S.S. #18) built around 1870. Renovated with two additions to the original school house, it has 2 rooms and home a co-operative day care centre. There is also an outdoor pool that operates during the summer months.

Outside is small grass area and two tennis courts.

The community centre historic school house is twin of Cedar Grove Community Centre, formerly Cedar Grove Schoolhouse (S.S. #20) c. 1869.

In film
 The 1974 film, Vengeance is Mine, starring Ernest Borgnine was filmed partially at the Box Grove United Church.

References

External links
 City of Markham

Neighbourhoods in Markham, Ontario